The 1997 FIFA Confederations Cup was the first Confederations Cup to be organised by FIFA. The tournament had previously been played in 1992 and 1995 as the King Fahd Cup. This edition of the tournament was hosted by Saudi Arabia, as with the previous editions, in December 1997 and was the first to feature representatives from all of the FIFA confederations.

It was won by Brazil, who beat Australia 6–0 in the final. After winning the 1997 tournament, Brazil became the first country to be the reigning champion of both major FIFA tournaments (the World Cup and the Confederations Cup), as well as champion of their respective confederation by winning the 1997 Copa América. This feat has since been accomplished once by France, victorious in the 1998 World Cup, UEFA Euro 2000 and the 2001 FIFA Confederations Cup.

Qualified teams

1Germany, the UEFA Euro 1996 winner, declined to participate.

2The United Arab Emirates was awarded a spot in the competition because Saudi Arabia had won the 1996 AFC Asian Cup.

Venue
All matches were played in 67,000-seat King Fahd International Stadium in Riyadh.

Match referees

Africa
 Lucien Bouchardeau
 Ian McLeod
Asia
 Saad Mane
 Pirom Un-Prasert
Europe
 Nikolai Levnikov

North America, Central America and Caribbean
 Ramesh Ramdhan
South America
 Javier Castrilli
 René Ortubé

Squads

Group stage

Group A

Group B

Knockout stage

Semi-finals

Third place play-off

Final

Awards

Statistics

Goalscorers
Romário received the Golden Shoe award for scoring seven goals. In total, 52 goals were scored by 32 different players, with only one of them credited as own goal.

7 goals
 Romário

5 goals
 Vladimír Šmicer

4 goals
 Ronaldo

3 goals
 Cuauhtémoc Blanco

2 goals

 Pavel Nedvěd
 Francisco Palencia
 Helman Mkhalele
 Nicolás Olivera
 Darío Silva

1 goal

 Mark Viduka
 John Aloisi
 Damian Mori
 Harry Kewell
 César Sampaio
 Denílson
 Júnior Baiano
 Horst Siegl
 Edvard Lasota
 Mohammed Al-Khilaiwi
 Luis Hernández
 Braulio Luna
 Ramón Ramírez
 Pollen Ndlanya
 Lucas Radebe
 Brendan Augustine
 Hassan Mubarak
 Adnan Al Talyani
 Antonio Pacheco
 Marcelo Zalayeta
 Christian Callejas
 Álvaro Recoba

Own goal
 Mohamed Obaid (against Czech Republic)

Tournament ranking

Team of the Tournament

See also

 1997 Tournoi de France

References

External links

FIFA Confederations Cup Saudi Arabia 1997, FIFA.com
FIFA Technical Report (Part 1), (Part 2) and (Part 3)

 
1997
1997
1997–98 in Saudi Arabian football
Brazil at the 1997 FIFA Confederations Cup
1997 in Australian soccer
1997–98 in Czech football
1997 in Uruguayan football
1997–98 in Emirati football
1997–98 in Mexican football
1997–98 in South African soccer
December 1997 sports events in Asia
1997 in association football